Kenneth James Price (born April 7, 1950) is a former American football linebacker who played for the New England Patriots of the National Football League (NFL). He played college football at University of Iowa.

References 

1950 births
Living people
Players of American football from Houston
American football linebackers
Iowa Hawkeyes football players
New England Patriots players